The Pete Newell Big Man Award has been awarded by the National Association of Basketball Coaches since 2000. It is presented to the top low-post player each season.  The award is named after Pete Newell, the coach who ran the Pete Newell Big Man Camp for low-post players from 1976 until his death in 2008.

Only four schools, Duke, Utah, Purdue, and Kentucky have produced more than one winner; Duke has had three winners, and the others have two each. Utah's winners are two of the only three to have been born outside the U.S.—Andrew Bogut in Australia and Jakob Pöltl in Austria. The third is Oscar Tshiebwe, born in the Democratic Republic of the Congo.

Winners

References

External links
 Official site

Awards established in 2000
College basketball trophies and awards in the United States
National Association of Basketball Coaches